Napa Valley Railroad may refer to:
Napa Valley Railroad (1864–1869), predecessor of the Southern Pacific Company
Napa Valley Wine Train